Kyra Lillee Cooney-Cross (born 15 February 2002) is an Australian soccer player who plays as a midfielder for Hammarby IF in the Damallsvenskan and represents Australia internationally. She has previously played for Western Sydney Wanderers and Melbourne Victory in the W-League.

Early life
Cooney-Cross was born to Jai Cross and Jessica Cooney in Herston, Queensland. Jai played football at semi-pro level in Queensland with Sunshine Coast and he wanted his daughter to grow up with a ball at her feet. Usually playing with older girls and boys, at the age of 13, she started at FFV NTC and a year later trialled for the Mini Matildas. Cooney-Cross attended Ballarat High School as well as Surf Coast Secondary College in Torquay, Victoria before dropping out to pursue her dream of soccer.

Club career
Cooney-Cross spent three years in Ballarat City between 2013 and 2016, playing under the tutelage of Ballarat City coach Tessa Curtain.

In 2017, she was signed by Melbourne Victory for the 2017-18 W-League season. On 28 October 2017, she made her debut for the club in a 2–1 home win against Canberra United, playing the full 90 minutes in her first competitive league match. On 29 December 2017, she scored her first ever goal for the club in a 3–1 home loss against Newcastle Jets, heading in at the 28th minute mark behind Jets goalkeeper Britt Eckerstrom. By the end of the season she played in Victory's all twelve games, scoring two goals. In the 2018–19 season, she was part of the W-League premier title winning squad, though she was only able to play in four of the twelve matches.

She moved to Western Sydney Wanderers for the 2019–20 season, where she scored in her debut, a free-kick at the 92nd minute mark of a 2–1 home win over Adelaide United.

In December 2020, following one season at Western Sydney Wanderers, Cooney-Cross returned to Melbourne Victory. On 11 April, Cooney-Cross scored directly from a corner kick in the 120th minute of extra time to win the 2021 W-League Grand Final, beating season premiers Sydney FC 0–1.

On 15 March 2022, Cooney-Cross transferred to Hammarby IF in the Swedish Damallsvenskan, together with teammate Courtney Nevin, signing a two-year contract.

International career
In August 2016, Cooney-Cross was part of the Australia U-17s who participated in the 2017 AFC U-16 Women's Championship qualifiers, scoring six goals, the first four of which came against Palestine. She was later named in the squad for the 2017 AFC U-16 Women's Championship finals, where Australia was knocked out in the group stage, their only points coming from a 3–2 win against Bangladesh. Cooney-Cross scored in the 78th minute of the game to bring the scores level to 2–2, before Sofia Sakalis scored the winner in the 83rd minute, to help Australia finish third in the group.

In October 2018, Cooney-Cross scored the first three of her six goals of the 2019 AFC U-19 Women's Championship qualifiers. On 4 June 2019, she was named as a standby player for the Australian squad participating in the 2019 FIFA Women's World Cup. On 15 October 2019, she was named in the Australia U-20 squad participating in the 2019 AFC U-19 Women's Championship. She scored Australia's first goal of the tournament in a 5–1 opening match loss against North Korea, heading in at the 16th minute mark from an Indiah-Paige Riley cross.

Cooney-Cross made her debut for the Australian women's national soccer team in a 3–2 friendly loss to Denmark on June 10, 2021.

Cooney-Cross was selected for the Australian women's football Matildas soccer team which qualified for the Tokyo 2020 Olympics. The Matildas advanced to the quarter-finals with one victory and a draw in the group play. In the quarter-finals they beat Great Britain 4–3 after extra time. However, they lost 1–0 to Sweden in the semi-final and were then beaten 4–3 in the bronze medal playoff by USA. Full details.

Honours

Club
Melbourne Victory
W-League : Premiers (1) 2018–19
W-League: Championship (1) 2020–21

References

External links
 

2002 births
Women's association football forwards
Australian women's soccer players
Footballers at the 2020 Summer Olympics
Living people
Melbourne Victory FC (A-League Women) players
Olympic soccer players of Australia
Western Sydney Wanderers FC (A-League Women) players
A-League Women players
Hammarby Fotboll (women) players
Australia women's international soccer players
Sportswomen from Queensland
Soccer players from Brisbane
Damallsvenskan players
Expatriate women's footballers in Sweden
Australian expatriate sportspeople in Sweden
Australian expatriate women's soccer players